Howard Arenstein (born March 5, 1950) is an American news correspondent for CBS Radio and the radio bureau manager for CBS News in Washington, D.C.

Early life and education
Arenstein earned an undergraduate degree from State University of New York at Buffalo and then earned a master's degree in 1974 from the Annenberg School for Communication at the University of Pennsylvania.

Professional career
From 1974 until 1981, Arenstein resided in Israel, working as a reporter for The Jerusalem Post newspaper and for Israeli Radio. In 1978, Arenstein was hired by United Press International as the wire service's Jerusalem bureau chief and as an editor on UPI's foreign desk in New York and Washington.

In 1984, Arenstein joined CBS News as a writer on the overnight CBS News television broadcast CBS News Nightwatch. In 1987, he began working for CBS Radio.

During his time at CBS News, Arenstein has covered the impeachment process of President Clinton, the disputed United States presidential election, the September 11 attacks, the war in Iraq and the Beltway sniper attacks.

Arenstein has won two individual Edward R. Murrow awards for outstanding journalism - one in 2002 for feature reporting, and one in 2006 for covering the first home game of the Washington Nationals baseball team.

Controversies 
In 2010 Howard Arenstein and his wife Orly Azoulay were arrested for marijuana possession with intent to distribute. Washington police received a complaint that the couple was growing marijuana in their backyard and obtained a search warrant. During the raid the police found large cannabis plants standing more than 8 feet high. The charges later were dropped after prosecutors could not locate a witness.

In 2022 Howard Arenstein and his wife complained about receiving moving violations from a functioning stop sign camera in Washington DC. In response to someone who said that the ticket cost less than their toddler's medical bills from a driver that ran a stop sign and hit them, he wrote, "I feel bad for you. I am sorry. But this stop sign camera was fooling people (like my wife) who did not know it was there. Yes, everybody should always make a full stop but unfortunately not everybody does it in reality."

References

American radio personalities
American radio reporters and correspondents
American male journalists
University at Buffalo alumni
Annenberg School for Communication at the University of Pennsylvania alumni
1950 births
Living people